Mei Zhi (22 June 1914 – 8 October 2004) was a Chinese children's author and essayist.

Biography
Mei Zhi was born in Nanchang, Jiangxi, the eldest daughter of three children. Mei joined the League of Left-Wing Writers in Shanghai in 1932. She met another member of this group, Hu Feng, in 1933 when he returned after being deported from Japan and the two married at the end of the year. The two lived in Shanghai, where their home became a meeting place for other members of the League of Left-Wing Writers. Mei published her first volume in 1934 titled Shoushang zhi ye().

During the Second Sino-Japanese War, Mei moved with her family first to Wuhan, then to Chongqing. Whilst they moved, Hu increased the number of publications of his literary magazine Qi Yue, which Mei copy-edited. Mei also edited the magazine Xiwang. In 1941, Mei fled with her family to Hong Kong, which soon fell to the Japanese, after which they went to Guilin. By 1946, the family reached Shanghai, where Mei stayed with their three children until 1949.

Arrest
In May 1955, both Mei and Hu were arrested for counter-revolutionary activities. Mei's alleged crime was that she had transcribed Hu's book Sanshi fangyan. She was released in 1961 after the death of her mother, but was only permitted to visit Hu in prison in 1965. Hu was released in late 1965 and was sent to live in Chengdu in early 1966, accompanied by Mei, under surveillance by the Sichuan Municipal Public Security Department. In August, with the onset of the Cultural Revolution, the two were taken to a prison camp that produced tea in Lushan County, Sichuan. Later, Hu was imprisoned, and frequently fell ill, thus Mei was taken to the prison at Dazhou and made to nurse him.

Rehabilitation
In 1979, Mei was rehabilitated and allowed to return to Chengdu. In 1980, Mei was given official permission to take Hu to Beijing, in order to help his increasingly serious mental illness. Hu died in 1985, after which Mei wrote several memoirs detailing his experiences in prison.

Mei joined the China Writers Association in 1982.

Written works

Children's literature

Memoirs

Legacy
Mei was portrayed by Yuan Quan in the 2014 film The Golden Era.

References

1914 births
2004 deaths
People from Nanchang
Republic of China writers
Republic of China essayists
20th-century Chinese women writers
20th-century Chinese writers
Writers from Jiangxi
20th-century essayists